This is a list of colleges and universities in Jacksonville, Florida and its metropolitan area.

Institutions

See also 

List of colleges and universities in Florida for a full listing of the institutions of higher education in Florida.

Notes and references

 
Jacksonville
Colleges and Universities
Universities